Sterling, Wisconsin may refer to:
 Sterling, Polk County, Wisconsin, a town
 Sterling, Vernon County, Wisconsin, a town